Jon Reep (born March 26, 1972) is an American stand-up comedian and actor, known as the "That thing got a Hemi?" guy in Dodge commercials starting in 2004. From 2004 to 2006, he played the recurring character Police Officer Gerald Bob in the ABC sitcom Rodney. In 2007, Reep won the fifth season of Last Comic Standing on NBC.

Early life
Reep was born and raised in Hickory, North Carolina. He has one younger brother, Jason. Their father, David, worked as the manager of a Goodyear store, and a part-time police officer. Their mother, Betty, was a receptionist at a local telephone company, Sprint. Reep was raised as a Baptist.

Education
Reep attended Fred T. Foard High School in Newton, North Carolina and played football.

After graduating high school, Reep began attending Catawba Valley Community College, while working at his father's Goodyear store.

In 1992, Reep transferred to North Carolina State University in Raleigh, North Carolina, and graduated in 1996 with a BA degree in theatre, mass communication, and public and interpersonal communication. After graduation, Reep landed a job as a production assistant with UNC-TV.

Personal life
In 1995, Reep was at a Carolina Panthers inaugural football game in Clemson, South Carolina when the Panthers mascot, Sir Purr, called him to the field. Reep started dancing in the endzone until the police arrested him. Reep was then sent some Panther memorabilia for the incident. On October 5, 2007, Reep married Genta Trimble in Maui, Hawaii. In March 2013, his wife Genta Reep filed for divorce. Their divorce is currently ongoing in the state of California.

Television roles

Filmography

References

External links

Jon Reep on Myspace

1972 births
Living people
American stand-up comedians
American male film actors
American male television actors
Hemi
Last Comic Standing winners
North Carolina State University alumni
People from Hickory, North Carolina
21st-century American comedians